Orthocomotis golondrina is a species of moth of the family Tortricidae. It is found in Carchi Province of Ecuador and in Peru.

The wingspan is 25 mm. The ground colour of the forewings is brownish grey, suffused with brown and with purple brown spots in the distal third of the wing. The hindwings are brown.

Etymology
The species name refers to the name of the cloud forest reserve Reserva Forestal Golondrinas in the Carchi Province, where the species was collected.

References

Moths described in 2007
Orthocomotis